is a Japanese television drama which aired on Fuji TV at 10:00 pm every Thursday from April 10, 2008, until June 17, 2008. It stars Masami Nagasawa, Juri Ueno, Eita, Asami Mizukawa and Ryo Nishikido of japanese idol group Kanjani Eight. The special, consisting of a recap and some new additional scenes aired on June 26, 2008.

The series follow the life of Michiru Aida, a beauty parlor assistant who returns to Tokyo after 4 years. Bullied by her seniors at work and abused by her boyfriend, she is reunited with her best friend during high school, Ruka Kishimoto, a skilled motocross racer. Takeru, a make-up artist, is introduced to Ruka by her housemate, Eri and thus begin a journey of friendship.

A manga counterpart focusing on Ruka's and Michiru's high school days is currently being published in Malika. Although episode 11 was supposed to be the final episode, a sudden phone call requested the producers to add on a special. A movie has also been announced due to Last Friends' immense popularity.

Last Friends was number 1 on Fuji's top 50 list from June 16 till June 29. However, it had since dropped to 6th place after the broadcast of the special and as of the week of July 7 to 13, Last Friends ranked 9th on the Top 50 list. Aside from the official website at Fuji TV, another website has also been created, named "Last Friends: Another".

Creation and conception
Juri Ueno and Masami Nagasawa were originally approached for the role of Ruka and Michiru. Asami Mizukawa was cast for the other woman character Taeko Asano planned to have in the drama. Takeru, however was a last minute addition because the producers wanted a male presence in the drama. Initially, the drama was to be only about domestic violence (DV) and gender identity disorder, portrayed  by Nagasawa and Ueno respectively. A character who used DV was then created.

Ueno was picked by Asano, who saw her performance in Rainbow Song. According to Asano, it was her intuition which said Ueno was perfect for the role of Ruka Kishimoto, a character with gender identity issues. Eita was cast because of his "feminine feel". Nagasawa was selected because Asano thought of her as the "smiling woman who worries".

Takeru's friendship with Ruka was in the "grey zone". Asano stated that Ueno was very enthusiastic about her role from the beginning, asking about the hairstyle and clothing when she accepted the role.

Theme
Centered around the current generation's afflictions, Last Friends follows the various issues of domestic violence, gender dysphoria and trauma. Each of the five characters are represented by an issue, which are:

Love - Michiru
Liberation - Ruka
Agony - Takeru
Solitude - Eri
Contradiction - Sousuke

Synopsis
Michiru Aida is a beauty parlour assistant who returns to Tokyo after four years of absence. She moves in with her boyfriend, Sousuke Oikawa, who works in the Child Welfare Division. She quickly becomes the victim of DV and is bullied at her workplace. Ruka Kishimoto is Michiru's best friend that works part-time at a mechanic shop and is a brilliant motocross racer. She has a problem which she cannot confide to anyone and her worry becomes evident throughout the series. Takeru Mizhushima is a professional hair makeup artist by day and a bartender by night who suffers from a traumatic past. The three meet by chance and a journey of friendship begins.

Plot
A pregnant Michiru is first seen walking in a fishing village area, wondering about her friends and a horrible death which occurred  laments the fact that she did not have the ability to know what is in a person's heart, and therefore could not stop the death. However, she acknowledges that her friends are supporting her even though she betrayed Ruka.

Present day Tokyo, Michiru is working at a beauty parlour when she sees her boyfriend, Sousuke Oikawa waving at her and pointing out a place to meet him for dinner. When she does, Sousuke gives her a cup for her birthday present and invites her to live together. Michiru gets permission from her mother and tells Sousuke that she will move in soon, first buying pair furniture. At the department store, Michiru is seen by Ruka, who chases the bus Michiru has boarded. In her hurry, Ruka bumps into Takeru and drops her cup. She catches up, and the two meet each other for the first time in four years. Later that day, Ruka meets Takeru again after Eri drags her along to the night bar where Takeru works.

Cast

Main characters

Japanese Live action actor: Masami Nagasawa

Michiru Aida is a beauty parlour assistant who gets constantly bullied at her workplace "Niche" by her seniors. Her mother doesn't care about her much, even forgetting her 22nd birthday. She moves in with her boyfriend Sousuke; who is the only one who she can confide her emotional problems to but becomes the victim of domestic violence.

She was Ruka's best friend in middle school and has not seen her for four years after her mother moved them to a relative's place in Choushi. Michiru graduated from high school in 2003.

After returning to Tokyo, she is spotted by Ruka while shopping for new furniture in accordance with moving in with Sousuke. The two then spend time catching up at a park which holds precious memories to each of them. In the past, Michiru would tell Ruka all of her family problems at the very same park, eat ice cream and take shelter from the rain there. When she returns to Sousuke's apartment, she is slapped because Sousuke thought that the messages that Michiru was receiving from Ruka was from a guy. Failing to find the graduation album in her house, Michiru returns and gets slapped again and promises to find it. When she returns to her house again, she sees her mother with another guy, so she decides to go to the park. Ruka finds Michiru by instinct after receiving a miss call from her, and brings Michiru back to the Share House. They spend the night there and after Ruka sees Michiru crying in her sleep, Ruka kisses Michiru.

She gives Ruka a good luck charm for the race, which Ruka considers to be the thing which saved her during the accident which occurred during the race when her bike flipped over. After the accident, Michiru nearly gets attacked by Sousuke until Ruka turns up and yells at Sousuke not to touch "my Michiru".

After being raped by Sousuke, Michiru moves out of the ShareHouse and isolates herself from everyone else. She goes back to Choushi, where nine months later, she is about to give birth. However, complications arises when it is discovered she has abnormal high blood pressure that can endanger both her child and herself. She manages to pull through and names the child "Rumi", Ru from Ruka and Mi from Michiru. Ru is also present in Takeru.

Taeko Asano has stated that Michiru and Ruka were not based on Naoko Takeuchi's Sailor Moon characters Michiru and Haruka despite rumors.

Japanese Live action actor: Juri Ueno

A brilliant motocross racer, Ruka Kishimoto was Michiru's best friend since middle school. When she meets Michiru after four years, she is delighted yet worried about it. She dislikes people discriminating against gender, like her motocross senior does. She comments that when she is racing and in the air, "everything disappears" and "you become a thing floating in air" regardless of gender. Ruka lives in the Share House with Eri.

Her main problem throughout the series is confessing her love for Michiru. There are moments where it is obvious that Ruka loves Michiru, yet Michiru doesn't see it. Sousuke describes Ruka looking at Michiru with "male like eyes". Her relationship with Takeru is different. While Takeru loves Ruka, Ruka treats him like a friend. Her father even states that Takeru looks "weak", much to Ruka's amusement.

In the past, she and Michiru often got in trouble with the patrol man for riding together on a single seat bicycle. They would stay at a park where Michiru would confide to her about her family problems, and Ruka would stay with her because she "couldn't leave her in tears". Ruka graduated from high school in 2003.

Her motocross number is #27. While initially looked down upon by her male senior, Ruka eventually wins the Kanto Motocross Competition. Ueno started training for the motocross scenes in February, and she commented that the bike was really heavy as it weighs 90 kg.

Taeko Asano commented that Ueno Juri "changed" her image from the Nodame Cantabile hairstyle to Ruka's clothing and hair style right before rehearsal. Asano also commented that "she's a natural genius" and that she became "the character itself" because Ueno changed her habits of walking, talking and sitting to emulate Ruka's style, even when the camera's were not in action. Ueno stated that the role of "Ruka" was starting to have an effect on her.

Asano has also stated that Michiru and Ruka were not based on Naoko Takeuchi's Sailor Moon characters Michiru and Haruka despite rumors.

Japanese Live action actor: Eita

A professional makeup and hair artist by day and a bartender by night, Takeru suffers from a trauma acquired during his childhood. As such, he is uncomfortable around women, except Ruka, whom he has fallen in love with. Many, including Eri at first, suspect him as gay because of his good looks yet the absence of a girlfriend.

When he was a child, his father was abusive but his mother remained by his side. His sister wanted an ally that would not betray her and used Takeru. It is not stated what happened between him and his step sister, but because of it, Takeru suffers from trauma and is afraid of a woman's body.

Takeru is injured badly because Sousuke thought he was the object of Michiru's affection. Due to the injury sustained, he loses his job.

However, when Michiru disappears, Takeru drags Ruka along to "fill her heart". They meet Michiru at the hospital after a minor accident, and after she gives birth, Takeru tells the baby that he will be the father.

{{nihongo|Eri Takigawa|滝川 エリ|Takigawa Eri}}Japanese Live action actor: Asami Mizukawa

An air stewardess, Eri is a happy go lucky woman who often finds herself miserable at love. She is the only original member of the ShareHouse other than Ruka prior to the main story. Eri loves to drink, and can speak various words in different languages due to her experience at work.

Eri often speaks whatever is on her mind, even guessing Ruka's feelings towards Michiru. When Ruka denies this, saying that she treats everyone fairly, Eri also denies her statement because she felt that she was treated differently although Eri is Ruka's housemate. She regrets that she didn't know about Ruka's GID issue until after Ruka wins the motocross race.

When Ogurin tells her that he is leaving for Milan due to a transfer, she gets angry with him for apologizing. However, when she goes to work, Ogurin turns up with a bunch of roses, asking her to marry him. She marries Ogurin despite him being good for nothing, insinuating that her love is enough for both of them. Both of them move out of the ShareHouse due to Ogurin's transfer to Italy, but return eventually after a year for a reunion.Japanese Live action actor: Ryo Nishikido

Sousuke Oikawa is Michiru's boyfriend who works in the Children's Welfare department. He abuses Michiru and seems to suffer from multiple personalities, once slapping her then apologizing and
hugging the next moment. He beats up Takeru as he mistakenly assumes that Takeru was the guy Ruka said that Michiru liked. Sousuke also nearly rapes Ruka, but Ruka manages to get away at the last minute by smashing a lamp into him.

The only relationship he has besides being Michiru's boyfriend is with a young boy who he rescues from an abusive parent. He saves the child's life from an oncoming train, breaking several of his bones in the process.

When he was 10, Sousuke was raised by various relatives after his mother ran away with a customer at the supermarket where she had worked. It is because of this that Sousuke wanted to marry Michiru and raise a happy family.

Sousuke commits suicide at the end of the series because he felt he could not give Michiru the happiness she found with the ShareHouse members. He writes her a letter, explaining his actions and how he understood that the only way to set Michiru free was to kill himself.

Masami Nagasawa, who played opposite Nishikido as Michiru, stated that "his type of acting is more difficult than mine. He also worries about me being hit accidentally."

Supporting characters
Tomohiko OguraJapanese Live action actor: Shigenori Yamazaki
Tomohiko Ogura is Eri's senior at their workplace. He has an estranged relationship with his wife Eiko and decides to move into the ShareHouse while he finds a way to solve his problem. He is often called Ogurin''. Ogurin is very cowardly sometimes, unable to stand up for himself or worry a lot about his wellbeing.

He realizes that he has been in love with Eri all along, and marries her. They both move out of the ShareHouse due to Ogurin's transfer to Italy, but return eventually after a year.

Aki Nishihara as Reina Hiratsuka
Rea Ranka as Sayuri Mita
Sayaka Hirano as Mayumi Okabe
Mitsuko Baisho as Chinatsu Aida
Michiru's mother, she is often drunk and very careless. She gambles and borrows money often, leading to financial burdens on Michiru. At the start of the drama, she finds a new lover which makes Michiru irritated. When Chinatsu needed money to pay of some debts, Sousuke offers her some and in return she tells him of Michiru's location.

Takeru Shibuya as Naoya Higuchi
Toshiyuki Kitami as Kenichiro Endo
Yuko Ito as Yuko Shirahata
Takeru's sister. Their past is vaguely shown, but it is clear that she did something to Takeru which made him fear a woman's body.
 
Tetsushi Tanaka as Kazumi Hayashida
Hayashida is Ruka's motocross senior. Often looking down on women, Hayashida believes that it is almost impossible for a woman to reach the speed and level of a male racer. He once tried to hit on her, but Ruka manages to ward him off.

Mayumi Asaka as Yoko Kishimoto
Mitsuru Hirata as Shuji Kishimoto
Mitsuki Nagashima as Shogo Kishimoto
Shogo is Ruka's younger brother. The Kishimoto family is very supportive of Ruka.

Setting
The drama takes place in modern-day Tokyo.

The ShareHouse is a house where members share the rent (40000 yen per person) amongst themselves. Takeru mentions to Chinatsu Aida that the house is shared among five people, but the full capacity is unknown. In the beginning, Ruka and Eri are the only members of the ShareHouse, but soon Takeru, Ogurin and Michiru move in as well. The members share the facilities, such as the toilet, kitchen and living room, but each of them have their own rooms. Eri lets Ogurin into her room at times.

The Inokashira Park is another notable setting. When Michiru and Ruka were in high school, they used to go to the park and spend time there. Michiru and Ruka reminisce about their high school days when they meet after four years. After Michiru was beaten up by Sousuke, Ruka finds her in the park. Ruka and Michiru reconcile here after Takeru arranges the meeting. The park also serves as the location where Michiru hides after discovering Ruka's secret.

Media

Manga
The manga features Ruka and Michiru during their highschool days.

OST
 Name: Last Friends Original Soundtrack
 Release Date: June 11, 2008
 
An OST containing 21 different tracks have been produced. All songs were composed by Akio Izutsu except the last track.

DVD boxset
The series was released on October 15, 2008. Containing 6 discs, the boxset also includes extras, such as the mini series "Eri - My love" and other bonuses. The retail price for the set is 22800 yen without tax.

Others
The main cast members have appeared in the 2008 Spring Session of Waratte Iitomo. The Last Friends team scored a total 1330 points, the second last team in ranking. Juri Ueno, Asami Mizukawa and Ryo Nishikido were the three members who played the bow and arrow game, each scoring 100 points each. However, Ryo Nishikido's points were doubled to 200 because he had the golden arrow.

Masami Nagasawa, Juri Ueno and Eita appeared on Mentore G talk show on June 1, 2008. They talked about their roles and the program features their debut work, favourite hobbies and favourite food.

The May edition of the KazeRock magazine features Nagasawa, Ueno and Eita as rock band members.

Nagasawa and Ueno also appeared on Mezamashi TV for an interview. Eita commented that the two were really like Michiru and Ruka and kept holding hands. Nagasawa and Ueno insisted it was 
because both of them were nervous.

A pre finale radio interview was broadcast on June 15, 2008 at Masami Nagasawa's regular radio show. The interview took place at Odaiba's Wangan Studio and the guest were Ueno, Eita, Mizukawa and Yamazaki.

Ueno, Mizukawa and Eita all starred together in the live action series of Nodame Cantabile. Nagasawa commented during the pre-finale radio broadcast that the "Nodame Team" worked really well together.

The 5 cups made by Okaeri and used in the series run are available to be purchased.

List of episodes

Special

Reception
Last Friends was number 1 on Fuji's top 50 list during its run. However, it had since dropped to 6th place after the broadcast of the special and as of the week of July 7 to 13, Last Friends ranked 9 on the Top 50 list. The series have subsequently dropped to the 15th place and then the 16th place as of the week July 21 to 27. From July 27 to August 3, Last Friends ranked 19 and then moved up to 18 at August 10.
 
In the first quarter of 2008, Yahoo word search ranking placed Last Friends 1st on the list.

Oricon Style had a poll for the female audience's favorite actor and actress right after Last Friends finished its run. Ueno was voted 1st, while Nagasawa was tied with two others at 6th place. Eita tied in 4th position.

Last Friends came second in the "Best Drama" at the 12th Nikkan Sports Drama Grand Prix. Juri Ueno won "Best Supporting Actress" while Ryo Nishikido won "Best Supporting Actor." Masami Nagasawa tied in fourth place for "Best Actress" while Eita also came fourth in the "Best Supporting Actor" category.

In the 57th Television Drama Academy Awards, Last Friends won as Best Drama. Masami Nagasawa won the 3rd Best Actress award. Juri Ueno won as Best Supporting Actress, while Ryo Nishikido won the Best Supporting Actor award. Both Ueno and Nishikido won with straight sets from the fans, journalists and critics. Eita was the runner up in the Best Supporting Actor category. Last Friends was also awarded the Best Script, Best Director and the Best Theme Song for Hikaru Utada's "Prisoner of Love".

Awards

References

External links
Last Friends website
Last Friends: Another
Last Friends Chinese website

2008 Japanese television series debuts
Japanese drama television series
2008 Japanese television series endings
Fuji TV dramas